NK Veres Rivne is a Ukrainian women's football team of NK Veres Rivne. Based out of Kostopil, Rivne Oblast, until 2021 it was a separate women's football club Rodyna.

History
The club was founded in 2003 based out of the Kostopil regional sports boarding school (KOLISP) which itself was founded couple of years prior. The club was named after a local food factory "Rodyna". In 2005–2020 the club played at Higher League of the Ukrainian Women's League. The club's first team played for 16	seasons at the Women's Higher League recording 212 games played winning 39 drawing 30 and losing 143 times earning 147 points. It also scored 200 goals and allowed 664.

In April 2021, Kolos Stadium was rebuilt, while NK Veres Rivne continued its negotiations to acquire the local women's team.

Its first training session under new brand, the team conducted in July 2021.

Former presidents
 until 2021 Mykhailo Kryvko

References

External links
 Official webpage at NK Veres Rivne website
 Profile at Womensfootball.com.ua
 Profile at WFPL.com.ua
 Old website of Rodyna

 
Women's football clubs in Ukraine
Football clubs in Rivne Oblast
Ukrainian Women's League clubs
2003 establishments in Ukraine
Association football clubs established in 2003
Sport in Kostopil
NK Veres Rivne